Mong Kok station is a MTR station in Mong Kok, Kowloon, Hong Kong. It is now used by more than 200,000 passengers daily. The colour scheme for Mong Kok station is dim red. The station was initially named after Argyle Street as Argyle.

Location
Mong Kok station is located in the centre of Mong Kok in Kowloon, along Nathan Road at the intersection with Argyle Street. Major nearby places include MOKO, Langham Place, T.O.P. and the Pioneer Centre. Mong Kok East station is about 500 metres to the northeast.

History
Mong Kok station opened on 31 December 1979, originally as part of the Kwun Tong line. When the Tsuen Wan line opened in 1982, the station became an interchange station between the two lines.

Station layout
Mong Kok station serves as a cross-platform interchange for passengers changing between the Tsuen Wan line and Kwun Tong line for stations in the same direction.

Entrances and exits
Mong Kok station has 15 entrances, tied with East Tsim Sha Tsui station as stations with most exits in MTR. The exits are located within one block north and south of the intersection of Nathan Road and Argyle Street, connecting buildings, shopping malls, main roads and ground transport facilities nearby.

A1: Mong Kok Road
A2: Portland Street
B1: Trade and Industry Department Tower
B2: Fa Yuen Street Municipal Services Building
B3: MOKO
B4: T.O.P (This Is Our Place) Mall
C1: Hang Seng Mongkok Building
C2: Shanghai Street
C3: Langham Place
C4: HSBC Building Mong Kok
D1: Shanghai Commercial Bank Building
D2: Argyle Centre
D3: Tung Choi Street
E1: Grand Plaza
E2: Wing Lung Bank Centre

MTR East Rail line
Mong Kok East station and Mong Kok station are considerably far apart. To reach Mong Kok East from Mong Kok, use exit B3, walk up the Mong Kok Road Footbridge System, and go via MOKO to reach Mong Kok East. Passengers wishing to transfer to the East Rail line may do so at Kowloon Tong station.

Gallery

References

Kwun Tong line
Mong Kok
MTR stations in Kowloon
Railway stations in Hong Kong opened in 1979
Tsuen Wan line